Eupithecia bowmani is a moth in the family Geometridae. It is found in the Rocky Mountains region of Alberta and British Columbia, as well as Indiana and Michigan.

The wingspan is about 14 mm. Adults have been recorded from April to July.

References

Moths described in 1923
bowmani
Moths of North America